Dr. Rush may refer to:

 Dr. Benjamin Rush, a founding father of the United States.
 Dr. J. H. Rush, an American physician.
 Dr. Nicholas Rush, a fictional character in the Canadian-American television series Stargate Universe.